This is the discography documenting songs and albums produced by American R&B singer Raphael Saadiq.

Production discography

Composition discography

References

External links

Sisqo
Saadiq, Raphael
Raphael Saadiq